The Marqīyah spring minnow (Pseudophoxinus hasani) is a species of ray-finned fish in the family Cyprinidae.
It is found in Nahr Marqīyah stream in Syria.

References

Pseudophoxinus
Endemic fauna of Syria
Fish described in 1992